Podoconiosis, also known as nonfilarial elephantiasis, is a disease of the lymphatic vessels of the lower extremities that is caused by chronic exposure to irritant soils. It is the second most common cause of tropical lymphedema after lymphatic filariasis, and it is characterized by prominent swelling of the lower extremities, which leads to disfigurement and disability. Methods of prevention include wearing shoes and using floor coverings. Mainstays of treatment include daily foot hygiene, compression bandaging, and when warranted, surgery of overlying nodules.

Signs and symptoms 
Podoconiosis causes bilateral yet asymmetrical leg swelling with overlying firm nodules. Early on, symptoms may include itching, tingling, widening of the forefoot, and swelling which then progress to soft edema, skin fibrosis, papillomatosis, and nodule formation resembling moss, giving rise to the disease's alternate name of "mossy foot" in some regions of the world.  As with other forms of tropical lymphedema, chronic disease can lead to rigid toes, ulceration, and bacterial superinfection. During acute episodes of adenolymphangitis, patients may develops fevers, extremity warmth, redness, and pain. These episodes are extremely debilitating and account for many days of activity and productivity loss each year.

Psychological consequences 
As a result of its appearance, podoconiosis can cause social stigmatization and discrimination. People with podoconiosis also report a lower quality of life than people in  similar neighborhood circumstances except without podoconiosis and also higher levels of mental distress and depression.

Pathophysiology 

According to the World Health Organization "Evidence suggests that podoconiosis is the result of a genetically determined abnormal inflammatory reaction to mineral particles in irritant red clay soils derived from volcanic deposits".

The pathophysiology of podoconiosis is a combination of genetic susceptibility, possibly through associations with HLA-DQA1, HLA-DQB1, and HLA-DRB1 variants, and a cumulative exposure to irritant soil. In susceptible individuals, irritant soil particles penetrate the feet and collect in lymphatic vessels. Over time, chronic inflammation within the lymphatic vessels leads to fibrosis and occlusion.

Diagnosis

Differential diagnosis 
The differential diagnosis for podoconiosis includes other causes of tropical lymphedema, such as filariasis or leprosy, and mycetoma pedis.

While filariasis is generally unilateral, podoconiosis affects the legs bilaterally albeit asymmetrically and in an ascending manner. Podoconiosis very rarely affects the groin while filariasis frequently involves the groin: a high ratio of lymphoedema/hydrocele cases in an area suggests podoconiosis as the dominant cause of lymphedema. In some cases, the history and clinical presentation alone are unable to differentiate between the two causes of tropical lymphedema. Local epidemiology can also be a clue to diagnosis, as podoconiosis is typically found in higher altitude areas with volcanic soils while filariasis is common in low-lying areas where mosquitos are prevalent. Blood smears for identification of microfilariae and antigen detection techniques can be helpful in the diagnosis of lymphatic filariasis.

Lepromatous lymphedema can also mimic podoconiosis clinically, but the former will have loss of sensation in the toes and feet, thickened nerves, and trophic ulcers. Other causes of lymphedema include Kaposi sarcoma, mycetoma, and elephantiasis nostras verrucosa.

Prevention
Elimination of podoconiosis relies on prevention with widespread shoe implementation, stringent foot hygiene, and floor coverings. Community-based initiatives are crucial to achieving elimination of this disease. In Ethiopia, The Mossy Foot Treatment and Prevention Association (now Mossy Foot International) works to transform patients into community podoconiosis agents who in turn visit patients, teach basic treatment techniques such as foot hygiene, and educate families about the disease. This model has been adapted by several other non-government groups as they have started programs in other regions of Ethiopia.

In 2011, podoconiosis was added to the World Health Organization's neglected tropical diseases list, which was an important milestone in raising global awareness of the condition.
The efforts of the Global Programme to Eliminate LF are estimated to have prevented 6.6 million new filariasis cases from developing in children between 2000 and 2007, and to have stopped the progression of the disease in another 9.5 million people who had already contracted it. Dr. Mwele Malecela, who chairs the programme, said: "We are on track to accomplish our goal of elimination by 2020." In 2010, the WHO published a detailed progress report on the elimination campaign in which they assert that of the 81 countries with endemic LF, 53 have implemented mass drug administration, and 37 have completed five or more rounds in some areas, though urban areas remain problematic.

Treatment 

The cornerstone of prevention and treatment of podoconiosis is avoidance of exposure to irritant soils.  Wearing shoes in the presence of irritant soils is the primary method of exposure reduction.  In Rwanda, a country of high disease prevalence, the government has banned walking barefoot in public, in order to prevent podoconiosis and other soil-borne diseases. Increasing the availability of footwear must be coupled with education on the benefits of wearing shoes as cultural influences, such as barefoot traditions, can hinder widespread use of footwear.

Once the disease has developed, rigorous foot hygiene including daily washing with soap and water, application of an emollient, and nightly elevation of the affected extremity has been shown to reduce frequency of acute attacks.  Nodules will not resolve with these conservative measures, although surgical removal of the nodules can be performed.

Epidemiology 
Podoconiosis is most frequently seen in the highland areas of Africa, India, and Central America.  The highest prevalence is seen in Uganda, Tanzania, Kenya, Rwanda, Burundi, Sudan, and Ethiopia. A recent review has summarized the global distribution of podoconiosis.  In some areas of Ethiopia, the prevalence is as high as 4%.  The incidence of podoconiosis increases with age, likely due to cumulative exposure to irritant soil.  It is very rare to see podoconiosis in the 0–5 year old age group, and the incidence rapidly rises from 6 to 20 years of age, with the highest prevalence after 45 years of age.  Podoconiosis is most commonly seen in higher altitude areas with volcanic soil, and it is estimated to affect 4 million people worldwide. Productivity losses associated with the disease are significant. In Ethiopia (where 1.6 million people are estimated to be affected), the condition is thought to have caused US $200 million in lost productivity per year in 2004.

History 
After parasitic filariae were discovered to be an important cause of tropical lymphedema in the 19th century, early investigators assumed that filariae were the sole cause of lymphedema in the tropics. It was later discovered that the distribution of tropical lymphedema and filariasis did not perfectly overlap, and researchers began to recognize that some forms of tropical lymphedema were not associated with filariasis. Ernest W Price, a British surgeon living in Ethiopia, discovered the true etiology of podoconiosis in the 1970s and 1980s by studying the lymph nodes and vessels of those afflicted with the disease. Using light microscopy, he observed macrophage cells laden with micro-particles in lymph nodes of the affected extremity. After examining the same tissue using electron microscopy, he was able to identify the presence of silicon, aluminum, and other soil metals both in the phagosomes of macrophages and adhered to the surface of lymphocytes.  Price demonstrated that the lymphatic vessels of these patients experienced subendothelial edema and eventual collagenization of the lumen leading to complete blockage. He wrote a monograph on podoconiosis which was published after his death in 1990.

Current situation 
Podoconiosis is now recognised as one of the WHO Neglected Tropical Diseases, its importance as a public health problem is well recognised in Ethiopia. Footwork is a charity which bring together public and private partners to support prevention and treatment of podoconiosis. There is an active research group led by Gail Davey at the Wellcome Trust Brighton and Sussex Centre for Global Health Research which co-ordinates research worldwide. A recent article in The Lancet includes some excellent illustrations.

References

External links 
 World Health Organization section on podoconiosis

Tropical diseases